The following lists events that happened during 1888 in New Zealand.

Incumbents

Regal and viceregal
Head of State – Queen Victoria
Governor – Lieutenant-General Sir William Jervois.

Government and law
The 10th New Zealand Parliament continues.

Speaker of the House – Maurice O'Rorke.
Premier – Harry Atkinson.
Minister of Finance – Harry Atkinson.
Chief Justice – Hon Sir James Prendergast

Main centre leaders
Mayor of Auckland – Albert Devore
Mayor of Christchurch – Aaron Ayers followed by Charles Louisson
Mayor of Dunedin – William Dawson followed by Hugh Gourley
Mayor of Wellington – Samuel Brown

Events 
1 September: 1888 North Canterbury earthquake

Undated
 First sightings of the dolphin Pelorus Jack in Cook Strait.

Sport

Athletics
The first New Zealand Championships are held.

National Champions, Men
100 yards – F. Meenan (Otago)
250 yards – A. Williams (Canterbury)
440 yards – A. Williams (Canterbury)
880 yards – Peter Morrison (South Canterbury)
1 mile – J. Field (Southland)
120 yards hurdles – Godfrey Shaw (Canterbury)
Long jump – T. Harman (Canterbury)
High jump – F. Perry (South Canterbury)
Source:

Horse racing
The Auckland Cup of 1887 is moved to January 1888. Future Auckland Cup's are normally scheduled for New Year's Day.

Major race winners
New Zealand Cup – Manton
New Zealand Derby – Manton
Auckland Cup winner (January) – Nelson (Australian owned)
Auckland Cup winner (December) – Lochiel
Wellington Cup winner – Beresford

National Champions
Singles – G. White (Milton)
Fours – R. Churton, L. Oughton, W. Carswell and D. Mackie (skip) (Taieri)

Polo
The first polo club in New Zealand is formed in Auckland.

Rowing
National Championships are held for the first time. They are held at separate venues; the single sculls in Wellington, the coxed fours in Wanganui. From the following year the Championships will be held at a single venue.

National Champions (Men)
Single sculls – J. Foster (Napier)
Coxed fours – Canterbury

Rugby union
The South Canterbury, Wanganui and Marlborough unions are formed.

The first ever British Isles rugby team tour takes place, visiting New Zealand and Australia. The visitors win all their New Zealand games except for one, losing to Auckland.
The first New Zealand Native team to visit Britain leaves at the end of the year.

Shooting
Ballinger Belt – Hon Major Purnell (NZ Volunteers)

Tennis
National championships
Men's singles – P. Fenwicke
Women's singles – E. Harman
Men's doubles – Richard Harman  and Frederick Wilding 
Women's doubles – E. Harman and E. Gordon
Mixed doubles – No competition

Births
 27 April: Daisy Osborn, artist 
 15 November: Cora Wilding, physiotherapist and artist.
 29 November: Thomas Hislop (Jnr), politician and mayor of Wellington.

Deaths
 3 June; Joseph Beswick, politician
 14 July: Samuel Revans, politician and journalist.
 30 August: George O'Brien, painter.
 18 October: Mary Ann Buxton, educator.
 28 November: William Meluish, photographer and businessman.
 (in England, no date) John Bacot', politician.

See also
List of years in New Zealand
Timeline of New Zealand history
History of New Zealand
Military history of New Zealand
Timeline of the New Zealand environment
Timeline of New Zealand's links with Antarctica

References
General
 Romanos, J. (2001) New Zealand Sporting Records and Lists.'' Auckland: Hodder Moa Beckett. 
Specific

External links

 
1880s in New Zealand